Joey Garcia (born January 30, 1983) is an American attorney and politician serving as a member of the West Virginia House of Delegates from the 50th district. Elected in November 2020, he assumed office on December 1, 2020.

Early life and education 
Garcia was born in Marietta, Ohio, and raised in Fairmont, West Virginia. After graduating from Fairmont Senior High School, he earned a Bachelor of Arts degree in history from West Virginia University and a Juris Doctor from the West Virginia University College of Law.

Career 
Garcia has worked as a personal injury attorney at the Manchin Law Group, a firm founded by Tim Manchin. He previously served as senior counsel for legislation and policy and the director of legislative affairs for Governor Jim Justice. Garcia was elected to the West Virginia House of Delegates in November 2020 and assumed office on December 1, 2020. He also serves as vice minority chair of the House Technology & Infrastructure Committee and House Workforce Development Committee.

References 

1983 births
Living people
People from Marietta, Ohio
Lawyers from Fairmont, West Virginia
West Virginia University alumni
West Virginia University College of Law alumni
West Virginia lawyers
Democratic Party members of the West Virginia House of Delegates
Politicians from Fairmont, West Virginia